Hypoxis villosa is a plant species in the Hypoxidaceae, formerly included in the Liliaceae or Amaryllidaceae. It is native to southern Africa (South Africa, Lesotho, Eswatini).

References

villosa
Flora of Southern Africa
Plants described in 1782